Jazz Lab is an album by American jazz trumpeter Donald Byrd and saxophonist Gigi Gryce, released in 1957 by Columbia.

Reception

AllMusic awarded the album 4½ stars, stating: "With some of the best arrangements heard in jazz and excellent solos by Gryce, Byrd, and Flanagan, Jazz Lab makes for an excellent introduction to the hard bop catalog."

Track listing
All compositions by Gigi Gryce except as indicated
 "Speculation" (Horace Silver) - 3:38    
 "Over the Rainbow" (Harold Arlen, Yip Harburg) - 8:21    
 "Nica's Tempo" - 5:27    
 "Blue Concept" - 5:03    
 "Little Niles" (Randy Weston) - 7:04    
 "Sans Souci" - 7:17   
 "I Remember Clifford" (Benny Golson) - 4:57  
Recorded in New York City on February 4, 1957 (tracks 1 & 3), February 5, 1957 (tracks 2 & 6), and March 13, 1957 (tracks 4, 5 & 7)

Personnel 
Gigi Gryce - alto saxophone 
Donald Byrd - trumpet  
Jimmy Cleveland (tracks 5 & 7), Benny Powell (tracks 1 & 3) - trombone 
Julius Watkins - French horn (tracks 1, 3, 5 & 7)
Don Butterfield - tuba (tracks 1, 3, 5 & 7)
Sahib Shihab - baritone saxophone (tracks 1, 3, 5 & 7)
Tommy Flanagan (tracks 1-3 & 6), Wade Legge (tracks 4, 5 & 7) - piano
Wendell Marshall - bass
Art Taylor - drums

References 

1957 albums
Gigi Gryce albums
Donald Byrd albums
Columbia Records albums